The Taitung County Council is the elected county council of Taitung County, Republic of China. The council composes of 30 councilors lastly elected through the 2022 Republic of China local election on 26 November 2022.

See also
 Taitung County Government

References

External links

  

County councils of Taiwan
Taitung County